Dębów  is a village in the administrative district of Gmina Gać, within Przeworsk County, Subcarpathian Voivodeship, in south-eastern Poland.

The village has a population of 1,244.

See also
 Walddeutsche

References

Villages in Przeworsk County